The Hudson River Psychiatric Center in Poughkeepsie, New York was a building and a psychiatric facility for adults operated by the New York State Office of Mental Health. It was closed in January 2012, and patients were moved to Rockland Psychiatric Center.

It was located at 10 Ross Circle, in Poughkeepsie, not far from the defunct Hudson River State Hospital. The property continues to serve as an Office of Mental Health field office.

References

Buildings and structures in Poughkeepsie, New York
Psychiatric hospitals in New York (state)
New York State Department of Mental Hygiene